Henry George Blacklidge (14 July 1884 – 23 May 1917) was an English cricketer. He played seven first-class matches for Surrey County Cricket Club between 1908 and 1913.

In 1914, Derbyshire signed him up as a coach with the intention to play him when he qualified. During World War I, Blacklidge was a staff sergeant on the army gymnastic staff. He died from dysentery while serving in Amarah, Mesopotamia.

See also
 List of cricketers who were killed during military service

References

External links
 

1884 births
1917 deaths
Military personnel from Guildford
British Army personnel of World War I
British military personnel killed in World War I
Cricketers from Surrey
Deaths from dysentery
English cricketers
Royal Hampshire Regiment soldiers
Surrey cricketers